Iraqi nationalism is a form of nationalism which asserts the belief that Iraqis are a nation and promotes the cultural unity of Iraqis of different ethnoreligious groups such as Mesopotamian Arabs, Kurds, Turkmens, Assyrians, Chaldeans, Yazidis, Mandeans, Shabaks, Yarsans, and others. Iraqi nationalism involves the recognition of an Iraqi identity stemming from ancient Mesopotamia including its civilizations and empires of Sumer, Akkad, Babylon and Assyria. Iraqi nationalism influenced Iraq's movement for independence from Ottoman and British occupation. Iraqi nationalism was an important factor in the 1920 Revolution against British occupation, and the 1958 Revolution against the British-installed Hashemite monarchy.

There are two prominent variants. One variant views an Iraqi nation as one which involves Arab, Turkmen, Assyrian and Kurdish people, all of whom have a common Mesopotamian heritage; this view was promoted by Abd al-Karim Qasim, who was of mixed Arab-Kurdish descent. The second variant is a dual nationalism which combines Iraqi nationalism and Arab nationalism, a much broader form of ethnic nationalism which supports Iraqi nationalism and links it to matters that impact Arabs as a whole. Saddam Hussein believed that the recognition of the ancient Mesopotamian origins and heritage of Iraqi Arabs was complementary to supporting Arab nationalism.  

The Ba'athist regime officially included the historic Kurdish Muslim leader Saladin as a patriotic symbol in Iraq, while Saddam called himself son of the Babylonian King Nebuchadnezzar and had stamped the bricks of ancient Babylon with his name and titles next to him.

Iraqi nationalist identity and culture
Iraqi nationalism has emphasized Iraq's cultural heritage which dates back to ancient Sumer, Akkad, Babylonia and Assyria, states that are considered the cradle of civilization that spread civilization to other parts of the world. The Babylonian ruler Nebuchadnezzar II and Kurdish Muslim leader Saladin  are two important historical figures of Iraq and iconic figures in Iraqi nationalism.

The concept of contemporary Iraqi national identity may have originated with the rebellion and subsequent British siege of Najaf in 1918 during World War I, but this is disputed. By the 1930s advocacy of the concept of an Iraqi territorial identity arose amongst the Iraqi intellectual field and Iraqi identity grew in importance after World War II. Though Iraqi nationalism and Arab nationalism are technically separate from each other, both nationalisms influenced each other - adopting each other's metaphors and narratives. In some cases Iraqi nationalism has been advocated as a necessary supplement to Arab nationalism such as the Iraqi political newspaper Al-Hatif advocating Iraqi nationalism on issues of domestic Iraqi culture, and advocating Arab nationalism on issues of broader Arab culture.

During the Hashimite monarchy period in Iraq, it was commonplace for writers to write of an Iraqi identity separate from an Arab framework, Iraq's print media and education at the time emphasized Iraq's landscape, its tribes, and its unique poetry and literature. Beginning in the 1930s, Iraqi historians began to address the Iraq revolt of 1920 by Iraqis against the British as a formative moment in Iraqi history that Iraqi historians referred to as "the Great Iraqi Revolution".

Prominent early Iraqi nationalist figures were the intellectuals 'Abd al-Razzaq al-Hasani and 'Abbas 'Azzawi. Al-Hasani was strongly critical of the British Mandate for Mesopotamia, published his first volume of his work The History of Iraqi Governments in the 1930s (the second published in the 1950s), the first volume was endorsed by King Faisal I of Iraq.  Al-Hasani was a prominent proponent of Iraqi nationalism. In one of his works al-Hasani included a letter by Faisal I, the letter had Faisal I describing Iraq as suffering from religious and sectarian tensions due to Iraqis being unable to form a common nationalism. Faisal I described Iraq as being governed by a literate Sunni elite over illiterate and ignorant Shi'ite and Kurdish sects who opposed the central government. 'Azzawi wrote Iraq between Two Occupations - referring to the Turkish and British rule, that received acclaim by the Iraqi government that assisted him in publishing his work. The works of both al-Hasani and 'Azzawi were highly popular from 1935 to 1965, with many of their works being published in second and third editions and both authors' works influenced Iraqi nationalism.

Abd al-Karim Qasim promoted a civic nationalism in Iraq that recognized Iraq's Arabs and Kurds as equal partners in the state of Iraq, Kurdish language was not only formally legally permitted in Iraq under the Qassim government, but the Kurdish version of the Arabic alphabet was adopted for use by the Iraqi state and the Kurdish language became the medium of instruction in all educational institutions, both in the Kurdish territories and in the rest of Iraq. Under Qassim, Iraqi cultural identity based on Arabo-Kurdish fraternity was stressed over ethnic identity, Qassim's government sought to merge Kurdish nationalism into Iraqi nationalism and Iraqi culture, stating: "Iraq is not only an Arab state but an Arabo-Kurdish state...[T]he recognition of Kurdish nationalism by Arabs proves clearly that we are associated in the country, that we are Irakians first, Arabs and Kurds later". The Qassim government's pro-Kurdish policies including a statement promising "Kurdish national rights within Iraqi unity" and open attempts by Iraq to coopt Iranian Kurds to support unifying with Iraq resulted in Iran responding by declaring Iran's support for the unification of all Kurds who were residing in Iraq and Syria, into Iran. Qassim's initial policies towards Kurds were very popular amongst Kurds across the Middle East whom in support of his policies called Qassim "the leader of the Arabs and the Kurds".

Kurdish leader Mustafa Barzani during his alliance with Qassim and upon Qassim granting him the right to return to Iraq from exile imposed by the former monarchy, declared support of the Kurdish people for being citizens of Iraq, saying in 1958 "On behalf of all my Kurdish brothers who have long struggled, once again I congratulate you [Qassim] and the Iraqi people, Kurds and Arabs, for the glorious Revolution putting an end to imperialism and the reactionary and corrupt monarchist gang". Barzani also commended Qassim for allowing Kurdish refugee diaspora to return to Iraq and declared his loyalty to Iraq, saying "Your Excellency, leader of the people: I take this opportunity to tender my sincere appreciation and that of my fellow Kurdish refugees in the Socialist countries for allowing us to return to our beloved homeland, and to join in the honor of defending the great cause of our people, the cause of defending the republic and its homeland."

Saddam Hussein and Iraqi Ba'athist ideologists sought to fuse a connection between ancient Babylonian and Assyrian civilization in Iraq to the Arab nationalism by claiming that the Bablyonians and ancient Assyrians are the ancestors of the Arabs. Thus, Saddam Hussein and his supporters claim that there is no conflict between Mesopotamian heritage and Arab nationalism. 

Saddam Hussein as President of Iraq expressed himself as an Iraqi in state art - associating himself as a modern-day Nebuchadnezzar II and wearing both Arabic and Kurdish headgear in such art. Saddam Hussein also paralleled himself and the Ba'athist government to Saladin, the famous Kurdish leader of Muslims and Arabs against Crusaders in Jerusalem, who was from modern day Iraq.

Irredentism 

After gaining independence in 1932, the Iraqi government immediately declared that Kuwait was rightfully a territory of Iraq, claiming it had been part of an Iraqi territory until being created by the British.

The Qassim government held an irredentist claim to Khuzestan.  It also held irredentist claims to Kuwait.

Saddam Hussein's government sought to annex several territories. In the Iran-Iraq War, Saddam claimed that Iraq had the right to hold sovereignty to the east bank of the Shatt al-Arab river held by Iran. Iraq had officially agreed to a compromise to hold the border at the centre-line of the river in the 1975 Algiers Agreement in return for Iran to end its support for Kurdish rebels in Iraq.

The overthrow of the Iranian monarchy and the rise of Ruhollah Khomeini to power in 1979 deteriorated Iran-Iraq relations and following ethnic clashes within Khuzestan and border clashes between Iranian and Iraqi forces, Iraq regarded the Algiers Agreement as nullified and abrogated it and a few days later Iraqi forces launched a full-scale invasion of Iran that resulted in the Iran-Iraq War. In addition, Saddam supported the Iraq-based Ahwaz Liberation Movement and their goal of breaking their claimed territory of Ahwaz away from Iran, in the belief that the movement would rouse Khuzestan's Arabs to support the Iraqi invasion. In the Gulf War, Iraq occupied and annexed Kuwait before being expelled by an international military coalition that supported the restoration of Kuwait's sovereignty.

After annexing Kuwait, Iraqi forces amassed on the border with Saudi Arabia, with foreign intelligence services suspected that Saddam was preparing for an invasion of Saudi Arabia to capture or attack its oil fields that were a very short distance from the border. 

It has been suspected that Saddam Hussein intended to invade and annex a portion of Saudi Arabia's Eastern Province on the justification that the Saudi region of Al-Hasa had been part of the Ottoman province of Basra that the British had helped Saudi Arabia conquer in 1913. 

It is believed that Saddam intended to annex Kuwait and the Al-Hasa oil region, so that Iraq would be in control of the Persian Gulf region's vast oil production, that would make Iraq the dominant power in the Middle East. The Saudi Arabian government was alarmed by Iraq's mobilization of ten heavily armed and well-supplied Iraqi army divisions along the border of Iraqi-annexed Kuwait and Saudi Arabia, and warned the United States government that they believed that Iraq was preparing for an immediate invasion of Saudi Arabia's Eastern Province. The Saudi Arabian government stated that without assistance from outside forces, Iraq could invade and seize control of the entire Eastern Province within six hours.

Symbols

Iraqi nationalism today
After the 2003 invasion of Iraq, the country fell into a state of chaos. A weak central government along with the rise of sectarian civil war among the Iraqi people diminished the value of Iraqi nationalism. Many who call for a revival of Iraqi nationalism for the glory of the Iraqi people are stigmatized and stereotyped as Ba'athists. As living conditions deteriorated in many parts of the country and constant fighting raged on, many people thought less of their Iraqi heritage.

In recent years, analysts have observed a surge in Iraqi nationalism and patriotism as most Iraqis blamed sectarianism for the bloodshed and violence in the country.

One of the biggest factors that led to the 2019–2021 Iraqi protests was the rise of Iraqi nationalism among the youth.

Nationalism and foreign intervention 
The US invasion exerted influence on Iraq’s approach to intervention. Iraq is conceptualized as a politically-contested region following the de-Baathification process, which encompassed the transformation of the government. Ethnic groups held divergent conceptions regarding what it meant to be an Iraqi. Saddam Hussein, preceding 2003, established a dictatorship led by Sunnis after gaining power in 1979, which encompassed ethnic and sectarian tensions along with political inefficiency.Sectarian identification resulted in clashes between ethnic groups, contributing to their contrasting perceptions of foreigners. The intervention, both by the US and Iran, can be conceptualized differently from a nationalist perspective. On the one hand, nationalism promotes opposition against intervention because occupation connotes violating sovereignty, diminishing the state’s right to self-determination. The trespassing of another state’s legally-established boundaries confronts the notion of territorial sovereignty, therefore, nationalists fuel resistance against intervention. On the other hand, nationalists, to defend their nation, embrace external support to reach their objectives. National identity surpasses other types of identification, therefore, nationalists often support intervention as an instrument to eliminate the threats posed, in Iraq’s case, by the ISIL. The country’s majority ethnic groups, the Shia Arabs, the Sunnis, and the Kurds interpret intervention through their comprehension of nationalism. While the Shia Arabs approve of Iranian interference because of their shared sectarian identity, the Sunnis recognize Iran as an adversary, advocating for a powerful role of the US. The Kurds, an ethnic community that acquired American protection against oppression, encourage US interference. Regardless of their diverse sub-national attitudes, Iraqi national identity influenced them to support intervention because assistance in the armed struggle against ISIL is inevitable.

Nationalism and Shia-Kurdish relations post-2003 
The collapse of the Baathist system and the regime change equipped the Shias and Kurds to construct a power-sharing structure. Mutual recognition between the groups was conceivable because neither of them embraced an essentialist sense of identity that would have prevented them from cooperation. Postmodernism, which is appreciated by the two communities, dismantles the fixed notions of identity by perceiving personhood as fluid, fragmented, and in continuous change. The conceptualization of identity through this lens enabled them two engage in cooperation, although power struggles prevailed. The constitution depicts Iraqis as “ people of Mesopotamia”, which signifies their association with Islam and Islamic democracy, as encouraged by the Shiis. A break with the secular dictatorship of Saddam Hussein is apparent by emphasizing the Islamic foundation of the national identity by anchoring it in Iraq’s heritage.

Post 2003 revolutions 
In 2011 uprisings erupted all over the Middle East. The Iraqi population joined the Arab Spring in February 2011. Hundreds of people were protesting in Baghdad but also all over the city. People were protesting because the state was failing to provide them with basic needs and rights. The protestors demonstrated against corruption and nepotism. They fought for a better educational system and easier access to jobs. Many tensions came also from the fact that Prime Minister Nuri al-Maliki did not respect his promises in establishing security in the country. Protests ended in violence since the government did not provide the population with what they were fighting for.

In 2012, another uprising erupted. The main actor of this uprising is the Sunni community since the government was targeting Sunni politicians, as an example the Minister of Finance, a Sunni, was arrested. The scope of protesters was broad, the youth participants got support from tribal and religious leaders. Once again, the regime repressed the protests in violence. Some of the dissatisfied protesters decided to join ISIS and continue fighting against the regime. Overall, the protestants were fighting against sectarianism. This sectarian regime is the root of most of the corruption in the country. They wanted to overthrow the Muhasassa regime imposed by the US in 2003. This regime is based on the division of power between all the different religious communities. This regime is the source of corrupted networks embedded in all religious communities. 

The Shia clerics also claimed that Iraq needs to overcome this sectarian regime. The Iraqi Grand Ayatollah Ali Sistani stressed in his sermons that sectarianism is an artificial construction created as a result of the US occupation.

The uprising of 2018 was more violent than the two first. The protests were organized on social media even though it did not become a proper organization. The demands of the protestors were socioeconomic and politico economic. 

In 2019, youthful demonstrators were protesting against corruption, sectarianism, and the absence of basic rights. Beyond demands for social reforms the protest has moved to a complete rejection of the ruling classes and the system imposed by the US in 2003. The protest was very violent and lethal. As a reaction more people from diverse backgrounds joined the demonstrations. With this last uprising the state lost all legitimacy.

See also
Ghazi of Iraq
Abd al-Karim Qasim
Muhammad Mahdi al-Jawahiri
Selim Matar
Safaa Al Sarai
2019–2021 Iraqi protests

References

 
Politics of Iraq